Charles McPherson (born July 24, 1939) is an American jazz alto saxophonist born in Joplin, Missouri, United States, and raised in Detroit, Michigan, who worked intermittently with Charles Mingus from 1960 to 1974, and as a performer leading his own groups.

McPherson also was commissioned to help record ensemble renditions of pieces from Charlie Parker, on the 1988 soundtrack for the film Bird.

Discography

As leader
 Bebop Revisited! (Prestige, 1965)
 Con Alma! (Prestige, 1965)
 The Quintet/Live! (Prestige, 1967)
 From This Moment On! (Prestige, 1968)
 Horizons (Prestige, 1969)
 McPherson's Mood (Prestige, 1969)
 Charles McPherson (Mainstream, 1971)
 Siku Ya Bibi (Day of the Lady) (Mainstream, 1972)
 Today's Man (Mainstream, 1973)
 Beautiful! (Xanadu, 1975)
 Live in Tokyo (Xanadu, 1976)
 New Horizons (Xanadu, 1978)
 Free Bop! (Xanadu, 1979)
 The Prophet (Discovery, 1983)
 Follow the Bouncing Ball (Discovery, 1989)
 Illusions in Blue (Chazz Jazz, 1990)
 First Flight Out (Arabesque, 1994)
 Come Play With Me (Arabesque, 1995)
 Live at Vartan Jazz (Vartan, 1997)
 Manhattan Nocturne (Arabesque, 1998)
 But Beautiful (Venus, 2004)
 Charles McPherson with Strings (Clarion, 2005)
 The Journey (Capri Records, 2015)
 Jazz Dance Suites (Chazz Mack, 2020)

As sideman
With Barry Harris
 Newer Than New (Riverside, 1961)
 Bull's Eye! (Prestige, 1968)
 Stay Right with It (Milestone, 1978)
 Tokyo 1976 (Xanadu, 1980)

With Charles Mingus
 Mingus (Candid, 1961)
 Mingus at Monterey (Jazz Workshop, 1965)
 Music Written for Monterey 1965 (Jazz Workshop, 1966)
 My Favorite Quintet (Fantasy, 1964)
 Let My Children Hear Music (Columbia, 1972)
 Charles Mingus and Friends in Concert (Columbia, 1973)
 Mingus at Carnegie Hall (Atlantic, 1974)
 The Complete Town Hall Concert (United Artists, 1983)
 The Complete Candid Recordings of Charles Mingus (Mosaic, 1985)
 Shoes of the Fisherman's Wife (Columbia, 1988)
 Charles Mingus Sextet Paris, TNP October 28th 1970 (Ulysse Musique, 1988)
 Live in Chateauvallon, 1972 (France's Concert, 1989)
 Charles Mingus in Paris: The Complete America Session (Sunnyside, 2007)
 Pithycanthropus Erectus (America, 1971)
 Reincarnation of a Lovebird (Prestige, 1974)
 Something Like a Bird (Atlantic, 1980)

With others
 Pepper Adams, Pepper Adams Plays the Compositions of Charlie Mingus (Workshop Jazz, 1964)
 Toshiko Akiyoshi, Just Be Bop (Discomate [Japan], 1980)
 Ray Appleton, Killer Ray Rides Again (Sharp Nine, 1996)
 Jeannie & Jimmy Cheatham, Sweet Baby Blues (Concord Jazz, 1985)
 Kenny Drew, For Sure! (Xanadu, 1981)
 Clint Eastwood, Eastwood After Hours: Live at Carnegie Hall (Warner Bros., 1997)
 Art Farmer, The Many Faces of Art Farmer (Scepter, 1964)
 Lionel Hampton, At Newport '78 (Timeless, 1980)
 Eddie Jefferson, Come Along with Me (Prestige, 1969)
 Eddie Jefferson, There I Go Again (Prestige, 1980)
 LaMont Johnson, New York Exile (Masterscores, 1980)
 Bobby Jones, Arrival of Bobby Jones (Cobblestone, 1972)
 Sam Jones, Cello Again (Xanadu, 1976)
 Dave Pike, Bluebird (Timeless, 1989)
 Jimmy Raney, The Complete Jimmy Raney in Tokyo (Xanadu, 1988)
 Red Rodney, Bird Lives! (Muse, 1974)
 Sonny Stitt & Don Patterson, Sonny Stitt/Don Patterson Vol. 2 (Prestige, 1998)
 Charles Tolliver, Impact (Strata-East, 1976)
 Charlie Parker, Bird (CBS, 1988)
 Don Patterson, Boppin' & Burnin' (Prestige, 1968)
 Don Patterson, Funk You! (Prestige, 1968)
 Larry Vuckovich, City Sounds, Village Voices (Palo Alto, 1982)
 Larry Vuckovich, Blues for Red (Hothouse, 1985)
 Dee Dee Bridgewater, Prelude to a Kiss: The Duke Ellington Album (Phillips, 1996)

References

External links
Charles McPherson NAMM Oral History Interview (2008)

1939 births
Living people
People from Joplin, Missouri
21st-century American male musicians
21st-century American saxophonists
American jazz alto saxophonists
American male saxophonists
American male jazz musicians
Arabesque Records artists
DIW Records artists
Mainstream Records artists
Prestige Records artists
Xanadu Records artists